Ruth Selke Eissler, (born in Odesa, Ukraine on February 21, 1906, and died in New York on October 7, 1989) was a Jewish–American physician and psychoanalyst. She is sometimes known as Ruth Eissler-Selke.

Life 
Ruth was born in Odesa (now Ukraine). Her father Ludwig Selke ran a bank and then worked as a grain export trader. Her mother, Jenny Lewin, was born on May 17, 1877, in Warsaw. In addition to Ruth, the couple had four other children: Eugen, Rudya, Eva and Angela. The family moved several times in her youth to Hamburg and Danzig.

Ruth Selke obtained her abitur in 1925 and then graduated from medical school at the University of Freiburg, Germany in 1930. She completed her residency in Heidelberg and after receiving her Doctor of Medicine degree at the University of Heidelberg (1932) and practiced in the Psychiatric Department of the Buerger Hospital in Stuttgart. Her dissertation was titled, Medical Histories of Six Cases: The Contribution of Social Hygiene to the Question of Alcoholism and Tuberculosis.

When Hitler came to power in 1933 in Germany, she went into self-exile in Vienna and worked at the psychiatric hospital in Rosenhügel. She specifically trained in psychoanalysis and was admitted as a member of the Vienna Psychoanalytic Society in 1937.

She began her own analysis with Theodor Reik but he went into exile in the Netherlands. She continued her analysis with Richard Sterba. Notably, she later became the analyst of Heinz Kohut who was a well regarded psychoanalyst.

In Vienna, she met the psychiatrist and psychoanalyst Kurt Robert Eissler (1908–1999), co-founder of the Sigmund Freud Archives, and they married in 1936. After Austria was annexed to Germany by Hitler on March 12, 1938 (an event known as the Anschluss) the couple moved to the United States arriving in Chicago, where she joined the Chicago Psychoanalytic Society while working as a child psychiatrist at the Michael Reese Hospital. During the Second World War, Ruth Eissler was a consulting physician in a program for young delinquent women in Chicago and in 1949 published a paper about her work.

In 1948, Ruth and her husband moved to New York City, where she became a member and educator of the New York Psychoanalytic Society. Eissler later became secretary and then vice-president of the International Psychoanalytic Association.

From 1950 to 1985, she was one of four editors of The Psychoanalytic Study of the Child, founded in 1945 by Anna Freud, Heinz Hartmann and Ernst Kris, and published annually.

Ruth Eissler's other writings included poetry, several short stories and a novel (that was never published). In celebration of her seventieth birthday, a collection of her German-language poetry was finally published In 1976 by Abaris Books in New York.

Ruth Eissler died in New York on October 7, 1989, survived by her husband.

The Selke-Eissler family collection 
The Leo Baeck Institute in Manhattan maintains the Selke-Eissler Family Collection, which contains archival material from family members under the identifier: AR 10926 / MF 875. Archives are from 1914 through the 1940s and mention the following individuals and families: Selke family, Eissler family, Eugen Selke, Ruth Selke Eissler and Jenny Selke. The archives contain items written in German, English and Russian.

Selected works 
 Selke, Ruth. "Sechs Lebensläufe als sozialhygienischer Beitrag zur Frage Alkoholismus und Tuberkulose." Klinische Wochenschrift 11.19 (1932): 805–807.
Eissler-Selke, Ruth, et al. eds. (1945-1985) Psychoanalytic Study of the Child. United States, Random House Publishing Group.
Eissler-Selke, Ruth. (1946). About the historical truth in a case of delusion. Psychoanalytic Review, 33, 442–459.
Eissler-Selke, Ruth. (1949). Observations in a home for delinquent girls. Psychoanalytic Study of the Child, 3-4, 449–460.
Eissler-Selke, Ruth, Blitzstein, N. Lionel, and Eissler, Kurt R. (1950). Emergence of hidden ego tendencies during dream analysis. International Journal of Psycho-Analysis, 31, 12–17.
Freud, Anna, and Ruth Selke Eissler. (1965). The psychoanalytic study of the child. Vol. 3. Yale University Press.
 Eissler-Selke, Ruth. (1976). Gezeiten: Gedichte in deutscher Sprache. New York: Abaris Books.

References 

1906 births
1989 deaths
Jewish psychoanalysts
American psychoanalysts
American people of German-Jewish descent
People from Odesa
Emigrants from the Russian Empire to Germany
German emigrants to the United States